European route E 87 is part of the United Nations international E-road network. It is an important north–south road on the coast of Black Sea, running from Odesa (Ukraine), Tulcea (Romania), Constanţa (Romania), Varna (Bulgaria), Burgas (Bulgaria), Çanakkale (Turkey), İzmir (Turkey) to Antalya (Turkey).

Route 

: Odesa - Mayaky

: Palanca

: Udobne - Izmail - Reni

: Giurgiulești

: Galaţi - Brăila 
: Brăila - Măcin - Isaccea - Tulcea - Babadag - Tariverde - Ovidiu
: Ovidiu - Constanţa
: Constanţa - Eforie Nord - Eforie Sud - Mangalia

: Shabla - Kavarna - Balchik - Varna 
: Varna - Priseltsi
: Priseltsi - Byala - Obzor - Nesebar - Pomorie - Burgas - Marinka - Zvezdec - Malko Tarnovo

: Dereköy - Kırklareli - Babaeski
: Babaeski - Havsa 
: Havsa - Uzunköprü - Keşan (Start of Concurrency with ) - Gelibolu (End of Concurrency with ) - Eceabat
: Eceabat - Çanakkale 
: Çanakkale - Ayvalık - Menemen 
:  Menemen - İzmir
: İzmir - Selçuk - Aydın
: Aydın - Denizli
: Denizli - Acıpayam - Söğüt
: Söğüt - Korkuteli - Antalya

References

External links 
 UN Economic Commission for Europe: Overall Map of E-road Network (2007)
 http://www.elbruz.org/eroads/E87.htm
 E87 on OpenStreetMap

87
European routes in Ukraine
E087
E087
E087